Franziska Zach (1900-1930) was an Austrian painter.

Biography
Zach was born  in Losenstein, Austria on 8 February 1900. She studied art at the University of Applied Arts Vienna where she studied with Alfred Böhm  and Oskar Strnad. After studying painting she went on to learn enamel work at the studio of Josef Hoffmann. She was a member of  Wiener Frauenkunst (Viennese Women's Art) and the Hagenbund.

Zach traveled to France and England, settling in Paris in 1930, where she died on 13 December 1930 at the age of 30.

Legacy
Her work was included in the 2019 exhibition City Of Women: Female artists in Vienna from 1900 to 1938 at the Österreichische Galerie Belvedere.

References

External links 
 

 

 
1900 births
1930 deaths
20th-century Austrian women artists
University of Applied Arts Vienna alumni